Majyuran Ragunathan (born 21 April 1989), better known by his stage name Majoe  is a German rapper of Eelam Tamil descent. He is signed by the Farid Bang-owned label Banger Music Records since 2012.

Career
Majoe was born in Duisburg, Germany, the son of Tamil immigrants. His family fled from the Sri Lankan Civil War to Germany. At the age of 16, Majoe began to rap with his companion the German rapper Jasko. Together they rapped as the duo Majoe & Jasko. The two boys released one extended play titled Übernahme EP. The mixtape attracted so much attention that the German rapper Farid Bang took them under contract. Majoe obtained extended fame when he recorded freetracks with German rapper Kollegah.

On 5 September Majoe released his first solo album Breiter als der Türsteher (B.A.D.T.) that includes 22 tracks on the premium edition.

Discography

Albums

Collaboration albums

Singles

With Jasko
Albums
 2012: Mobbing Musik
 2013: Majoe vs. Jasko

EP
 2011: Übernahme EP (Fatbeatz)
 2012: Übernahme EP (Banger Musik Edition)

References

External links
 Banger Musik website (in German)

1989 births
Living people
People from Duisburg
German rappers
German people of Sri Lankan Tamil descent